The 2017 Auburn Tigers football team represented Auburn University in the 2017 NCAA Division I FBS football season.  The Tigers played their home games at Jordan–Hare Stadium in Auburn, Alabama and competed in the Western Division of the Southeastern Conference (SEC). They were led by fifth-year head coach Gus Malzahn. Auburn finished the season 10–4 overall and 7–1 in SEC play to win a share of the Western Division title with Alabama. Due to their head-to-head win over Alabama, they represented the Western Division in the SEC Championship Game where they lost to Georgia. They were invited to the Peach Bowl, where they lost to American Athletic Conference champion UCF.

Recruiting

Position key

Recruits

The Tigers signed a total of 23 recruits.

Schedule
Auburn's 2017 schedule was announced on September 13, 2016.  It consisted of 7 home games and 5 away games in the regular season.  Auburn hosted SEC opponents Alabama, Georgia, Mississippi State, and Ole Miss, and the Tigers traveled to Arkansas, LSU, Missouri, and Texas A&M. The Tigers hosted three of their four non–conference games: Mercer from the Southern Conference and Georgia Southern and Louisiana–Monroe, both from the Sun Belt Conference. Auburn traveled to Clemson of the Atlantic Coast Conference. Auburn had seven home games during this season because it was playing non-conference Clemson on the road, a return date for Clemson's visit to Jordan–Hare in 2016.

Game summaries

Georgia Southern

Auburn opened the season against Georgia Southern.  Prior to this meeting, the two teams had only met once, a 32–17 victory for Auburn in the 1991 season. Auburn suspended QB Sean White, RB Kamryn Pettway, and WR Kyle Davis prior to this game.  The Tigers struggled on offense early, turning the ball over 3 times in the first half.  However, in the second half the Tigers started to find their rhythm.  On defense, however, the Tigers never struggled.  The Tigers held the Eagles to 78 yards and no third down conversions on 15 attempts and allowed no points (the only Georgia Southern score was a fumble return). Auburn now leads the all-time series 2–0 and has never lost to a Sun Belt Conference team (26–0).

Clemson

Auburn had one of their worst offensive performances in recent memory in a 14–6 loss at the defending national champions, Clemson.  The Tigers only mustered 117 yards of offense. The offensive line allowed 11 sacks on the night, one short of the Clemson record of 12 in a game.  The defense was a bright spot, though, as Auburn held Clemson to its lowest point total since November 15, 2014 and stopped Clemson's run game effectively, though Clemson was able to convert on third down many times due to the passing game.  The Tigers' 6 points were the fewest since they were shut out at Alabama in 2012.

Mercer

The third game of the season was against the Mercer Bears. It was Auburn's first game against Mercer since the 1922 season.  Many people expected it to be a blowout, but Mercer kept it close throughout the game.  Auburn's offense performed much better than the previous game, totaling 510 yards, and quarterback Jarrett Stidham had his best game completing 32 of 37 passes for 364 yards, which was the second most completions thrown by an Auburn quarterback in a game, only behind Patrick Nix against Arkansas in 1995.  Turnovers, however, plagued the offense, which committed 5 turnovers, including 4 fumbles (2 of which were in the red zone).  The defense once again played well, holding the Bears to just 10 points, just 246 total yards, and only 3.7 yards per play.

Missouri

The fourth game of the season was the first conference game for Auburn.  In their most complete performance of the year, the visiting Tigers routed Missouri 51–14.  Kerryon Johnson, in his first game back from an injury sustained in the first game, rushed for 5 touchdowns, one off the Auburn single game record of 6 held by Cadillac Williams.  Daniel Carlson, after some early season struggles, made 3 field goals, including 2 from longer than 50 yards.  It was Auburn's first game ever in the state of Missouri.

Mississippi State

In the fifth game of the season, it was a battle of teams in the top 25 as Auburn came in ranked #13 and Mississippi State was ranked #24.  The Tigers dominated from the start, scoring a touchdown on their opening possession.  After a Jarrett Stidham fumble, Mississippi State scored a field goal.  However, Auburn used the long pass effectively, using it to set up their next touchdown and scoring their 3rd touchdown on a long pass.  At halftime, it was Auburn 21, Mississippi State 10.  Auburn then shut out Mississippi State out in the 2nd half and scored 4 more times, giving them a 49–10 victory.  In this game, Mississippi State had 7 false start penalties, which coach Gus Malzahn credited to the nearly 87 thousand fans in attendance.  Also in this game, Daniel Carlson set the SEC record for most consecutive extra points made with 162 in a row.

Ole Miss

The sixth game of the season was a home game against Ole Miss. Ole Miss received the opening kickoff.  The Rebels drove down the field but the Auburn defense forced them to a field goal attempt which hit the upright and fell no good.  The Tigers then drove down the field and scored on their first drive.  The Tigers then allowed a field goal, but scored 4 more touchdowns for the 35–3 halftime lead.  In the second half, the Tigers played more sloppily, but won going away 44–23.  This was the first game of the season that Auburn allowed more than 14 points.  Also, Auburn kicker Daniel Carlson became the SEC's all-time leading scorer after scoring his 413th point, breaking the record of 412 held by Georgia's Blair Walsh.

LSU

After building a 20–0 lead, Auburn was stunned by LSU as they allowed the Fighting Tigers to go on a 27–3 scoring run and fell 27–23.  The Auburn Tigers came into the game ranked in the top 10, but the unranked LSU Tigers prevailed.  Jarrett Stidham had one of the worst games of his career after a hot start.  He had completed 7 of 8 passes to begin the game, he only completed 2 more the remainder of the game, although his receivers had many drops during the game.  The key plays for the LSU comeback were a dropped interception by Auburn's Daniel Thomas, which lead to an LSU touchdown later in the drive, and a punt return for a touchdown early in the fourth quarter to cut Auburn's lead to 23–21.  The Auburn Tigers only had 73 yards of offense the entire second half, which was a big part of the loss.

Arkansas

In the eighth game of the season, Auburn became bowl eligible with their sixth win of the year, a dominating 52–20 victory over Arkansas.  The Tigers started fast on offense scoring on their first two drives.  The defense started slow, but improved as the game went on, only allowing 13 points, only 6 of which were allowed by the first team (Arkansas scored on a kickoff return for an additional touchdown that was not allowed by the defense). It was only the second time Auburn had won at Arkansas since 2009.  The key play came late in the first half when Arkansas fumbled a punt which was recovered by Auburn.  The Tigers scored on the ensuing drive to make their lead 17–3 and shift the momentum of the game.  This was the second game of a three-game road stretch for the Tigers, as they preceded this game with a loss at LSU, and a game at Texas A&M after a bye week followed this game.  This was the Tigers' fourth SEC victory of the season, as well as the fourth SEC game they won by at least 20 points and the fourth time they scored 40 or more points in an SEC contest.

Texas A&M

After a bye week, Auburn concluded a 3-game road stretch with their final road game of the year, a trip to Texas A&M.  The Tigers claimed a 42–27 victory over the Aggies.  Kicker Daniel Carlson had unusual struggles, having two kicks blocked, both long attempts (49 and 52 yard attempts).  Also, the Tigers blocked a Texas A&M punt and recovered it in the end zone for a touchdown, the first blocked punt for Auburn since 2013, and first blocked punt recovered for a touchdown since 2006.  Jarrett Stidham had a great day passing completing 20 of 27 attempts for 268 yards.  After Kamryn Pettway was ruled out with a broken bone, Kerryon Johnson had to carry the ball more than usual and gained 145 yards.

Georgia

In the Deep South's Oldest Rivalry, Auburn defeated previously undefeated Georgia handily, winning by a final score of 40–17.  The Tigers held the dominant run attack of Georgia to 46 total yards and had 4 sacks of Georgia quarterback Jake Fromm.  Kerryon Johnson had 167 rushing yards against a powerful Georgia rush defense, which put him over 1,000 yards for the year.  Jarrett Stidham was also impressive, completing 16 of his 23 pass attempts for 214 yards.  Daniel Carlson, after going 0 for 2 on field goals last week, had 4 good field goal attempts becoming the SEC's all-time leader in made field goals.  This was Auburn's eighth win of the year, and their first victory over Georgia since 2013.

Louisiana–Monroe

The eleventh game of the year was a tune-up game for the following week's Iron Bowl.  However, the Tigers struggled early, being tied with ULM for most of the first half and only leading 14–7 at halftime.  The Tigers stepped it up in the second half, outscoring the Warhawks in that period 28–7.  The Tigers also struggled with injuries with many key players, such as Jeff Holland, Austin Golson, and Tre Williams going down during the game, though some injured players returned.  This was Auburn 9th win of the year, their most since 2013 (the Tigers had 8 wins twice since then and 7 wins once).  This also assured the following week's Iron Bowl would match up two top ten teams with the SEC Western Division championship on the line.

Alabama

The final game of the regular season was the annual Iron Bowl game against Alabama, with a trip to the SEC Championship on the line.  The Tigers struck first as Kerryon Johnson took a direct snap and completed a jump pass to Nate Craig-Myers.  The Crimson Tide responded with a long touchdown pass of their own.  The Tigers went ahead at the end of the first half with a field goal from Daniel Carlson to go into halftime with a 10–7 lead.  Alabama had a long, quick drive to begin the second half and scored to go ahead 14–10.  Auburn responded with another field goal to cut it to 14–13.  Auburn then scored twice more and stopped Alabama on fourth down three times to win 26–14.  Kerryon Johnson suffered a shoulder injury in the fourth quarter, and his backup, Kam Martin, twisted an ankle while playing for him.  Ryan Davis also set the Auburn record for receptions in a single season in this game.  The Tigers won the SEC West, and advanced to the SEC Championship Game against SEC East winner Georgia, whom Auburn defeated 40–17 earlier this season.

Georgia

The Tigers clinched a berth in the SEC Championship Game with their victory over Alabama.  The Tigers played Georgia for the second time this season, after defeating the Bulldogs 40–17 on November 11. It was Auburn's sixth appearance in the SEC Championship, going 3–2 with losses to Tennessee in 1997 and Florida in 2000, and victories over Tennessee in 2004, South Carolina in 2010, and Missouri in 2013.  It was also the first SEC Championship Game held in the new Mercedes-Benz Stadium after the Georgia Dome was demolished the week before. Despite beating #1 Georgia three weeks prior to the SEC championship, Georgia defeated Auburn 28–7, earning them a spot in the CFP Semifinal Rose Bowl at the #3 spot, where they will play #2 Oklahoma. Although they beat Alabama in the Iron Bowl, costing Alabama an undefeated season and a trip to the SEC Championship, Alabama was still selected to play #1 Clemson in the CFP Semifinal in the Sugar Bowl.

UCF

For their 10 win season, Auburn was chosen by the College Football Playoff committee to play in the Chick-fil-A Peach Bowl.  It is Auburn's second appearance in a CFP New Year's Six bowl, after the 2017 Sugar Bowl to follow the 2016 season.  It is also Auburn's fourth meeting with UCF, with the Tigers winning the previous three from 1997–1999.  Auburn will be making their sixth appearance in the Peach Bowl, and their first since 2011, when they defeated Virginia.  Overall, the Tigers are 4–1 in the Peach Bowl, with victories over Indiana in 1990, Clemson in 1997, Clemson in 2007, and Virginia in 2011.  Their only loss came against North Carolina in 2001.  It is the 50th anniversary of the Peach Bowl.  Coincidentally, Auburn also played in the 50th anniversary games of the Sugar Bowl and Cotton Bowl Classic as well.

Rankings

Players in the 2018 NFL Draft

References

Auburn
Auburn Tigers football seasons
Auburn Tigers football